The 2023 season is the San Jose Earthquakes' 41st year of existence, their 25th season in Major League Soccer and their 15th consecutive season in the top-flight of American soccer.

Roster

Transfers

In

Out

Competitions

Friendlies

Major League Soccer

Standings

Match results

U.S. Open Cup
The Earthquakes will enter the 2023 U.S. Open Cup in the third round as part of the lower tranche of MLS teams, as determined by their final position in the 2022 regular season. The third round is scheduled for April 18 and 19.

Leagues Cup 

The 2023 Leagues Cup, an expanded version of the inter-league competition between MLS and Liga MX, is scheduled to begin on July 21. All MLS matches will be paused until the end of the tournament on August 19. The Earthquakes were drawn into the West 1 group alongside Portland Timbers and Liga MX's Tigres UANL. MLS teams will play a minimum of two matches in the tournament, of which they will host at least one.

West 1

References 

San Jose Earthquakes seasons
San Jose Earthquakes
San Jose Earthquakes
San Jose Earthquakes